was a Japanese samurai, and the fourth son of the famed feudal warlord Oda Nobunaga and was adopted by Toyotomi Hideyoshi at a young age.

At the time of Nobunaga's death in 1582, Hidekatsu was at Kojima in Bizen Province. During the funeral, he held his birth father's mortuary tablet (ihai). Afterwards, Hidekatsu received Kameyama Castle in Tanba Province (modern day Kameoka, Kyoto Prefecture).

Shortly after Nobunaga's death, Hidekatsu assisted Hideyoshi during the Battle of Yamazaki, Hidekatsu and his biological older brother, Oda Nobutaka, were used as a banner of a battle of revenge, and defeated Akechi Mitsuhide. 

He also served Hideyoshi during the Battle of Shizugatake and Battle of Komaki and Nagakute in 1584. Hidekatsu suddenly died in 1586, with many people believing that Hidekatsu was killed on the orders of Hideyoshi.

Family
Father: Oda Nobunaga (1536–1582)
Adopted Father: Toyotomi Hideyoshi (1536–1598)
 Brothers:
 Oda Nobutada (1557–1582)
 Oda Nobukatsu (1558–1630)
 Oda Nobutaka (1558–1583)
 Oda Katsunaga (1568–1582)
 Oda Nobuhide (1571–1597)
 Oda Nobutaka (1576–1602)
 Oda Nobuyoshi (1573–1615)
 Oda Nobusada (1574–1624)
 Oda Nobuyoshi (died 1609)
 Oda Nagatsugu (died 1600)
 Oda Nobumasa (1554–1647)
 Sisters:
 Tokuhime (1559–1636)
 Fuyuhime (1561–1641)
 Hideko (died 1632)
 Eihime (1574–1623)
 Hōonin
 Sannomarudono (died 1603)
 Tsuruhime

Notes

References
 Hall, John Whitney, McClain, James L. and Jansen, Marius B. (1991). The Cambridge History of Japan. Cambridge: Cambridge University Press..

Samurai
1568 births
1586 deaths
Oda clan